Jason Lachance is a paralympic wheelchair racer from Canada competing mainly in sprint events.

Lachance has competed in three Paralympic Games.  His first was in 1996 where he competed in the T34 100m & 400m.  His great success came in the 2000 Summer Paralympics where he won silver in the 100m, gold in the 200m and a second silver in the 400m all in the T34 class.  In 2004 he was competing in combined T53/T34 events and ended the games without a medal.

Lachance stopped competing in 2007 after a serious accident. After years of hydrotherapy and rehab, he got back on the track in 2014. Due to limited mobility as a result of his injury, Lachance is now a T33 classified athlete.

He is a past world record holder in the 100m, 200m & 400m sprint events. T34 classified athletes

References

Paralympic track and field athletes of Canada
Athletes (track and field) at the 1996 Summer Paralympics
Athletes (track and field) at the 2000 Summer Paralympics
Athletes (track and field) at the 2004 Summer Paralympics
Paralympic gold medalists for Canada
Paralympic silver medalists for Canada
Living people
World record holders in Paralympic athletics
Medalists at the 2000 Summer Paralympics
Year of birth missing (living people)
Paralympic medalists in athletics (track and field)
Canadian male wheelchair racers